Schwaförden is a Samtgemeinde ("collective municipality") in the district of Diepholz, in Lower Saxony, Germany. Its seat is in Schwaförden.

The Samtgemeinde Schwaförden consists of the following municipalities:

 Affinghausen 
 Ehrenburg 
 Neuenkirchen 
 Scholen 
 Schwaförden
 Sudwalde

Samtgemeinden in Lower Saxony